Urgull (Gascon etymology for 'pride') is a hill by the ocean sitting at the heart of the Basque city of San Sebastián, Gipuzkoa, Spain. The hill (123 m at its highest point) shapes along with Mount Ulia and Igeldo the city's coastline relief, standing at the northern end of a peninsula formerly linked to mainland by a spit of sand between the river Urumea and the Bay of La Concha (nowadays a built-up area making up the city centre).

The hill became a defense point since the early ages of the city foundation in the 12th century, but the walls and the military structure were reinforced especially after the modern state boundaries took shape in the 16th century. The hill is topped by a stronghold (headquarters, barracks and warehouses), the Mota Castle, but it had a chapel and a conspicuous 12 metre-long sculpture of Jesus Christ added in 1950, now towering over the bay. 

The hill (as well as the city) was a hotspot for military operations, like the ones of the Siege of San Sebastián (1813) and the assaults of 1823, 1836 and 1876 (Carlist Wars). The hill lost its military interest on account of the city's newly acquired tourist resort status and was sold to the city council in 1924. Urgull shows nowadays a tree-covered surface for the most part, picturesque military structures reminiscent of other times and pleasant promenades with outstanding views over the bay and the city. The rooms of the stronghold at the hill top accommodate a small history museum, part of the major San Telmo Museoa located at the south-eastern access of the hill.

See also

External links 
San Sebastián, Monte Urgull (planetware)

Gipuzkoa
Hills of Spain
Mountains of the Basque Country (autonomous community)